The Lifetime Activities Center is a 5,000-seat multi-purpose arena in Taylorsville, Utah, on campus of Salt Lake Community College. The arena hosts the Bruins' basketball team, and formerly the G League affiliate of the Utah Jazz, the Salt Lake City Stars. Every February through March, it hosts Utah high school girls' basketball championships. In addition to the 5,000-seat arena, it also hosts a fitness center and weight room, as well as classrooms for SLCC classes.

References

Taylorsville, Utah
NBA G League venues
Salt Lake City Stars
Sports venues in Salt Lake County, Utah